David William Thompson (born July 21, 1994) is an American actor known for Win Win (2011), Blue Ruin (2013) and Green Room (2015). He plays Jonathan Crane/Scarecrow in the Fox television series Gotham.

Filmography

Film

Television

References

External links
 
 

Living people
1994 births
21st-century American male actors
American male film actors
Place of birth missing (living people)
American male television actors